Ağcaşar Dam is a dam in Kayseri Province, Turkey, built between 1979 and 1987. The dam creates a lake which covers an area of 4.17 km ² and irrigates 15,500  hectares.

See also
List of dams and reservoirs in Turkey

External links
DSI

Dams in Kayseri Province
Dams completed in 1987
1987 establishments in Turkey